The 2015 Kazakhstan Basketball Cup was the 13th edition of the Kazakhstan Basketball Cup, the highest professional cup basketball competition in Kazakhstan.

Group stage

Group A

Group B

Semi-final

Match for the 5th place

Bronze medal match

Final

2015
Cup